The Tobago Cycling Classic is a one-day road bicycle race held annually in Tobago, the smaller of the two main islands that make up the Republic of Trinidad and Tobago, in the Caribbean.

Created in 1986, at the beginning of October, for many years the race only featured local cyclists, but in 2000 opened to international riders. Formerly a stage race, since 2011 the race has been included on the UCI America Tour's calendar, carrying a one-day UCI rating of 1.2, and is also referred to as Tobago International.

Past winners

References

External links

Cycle races in Trinidad and Tobago
UCI America Tour races
Recurring sporting events established in 1986
Tobago
Autumn events in Trinidad and Tobago
1986 establishments in Trinidad and Tobago